Reuben Iceland (April 29, 1884 – June 18, 1955) was a Galician-born Jewish-American Yiddish poet, translator, and journalist

Life 
Iceland was born on April 29, 1884 in Radomyśl Wielki, Galicia. He began writing Hebrew poems in 1900 and Yiddish poems in 1904. He immigrated to America in September 1903.

In 1907, Iceland helped form the literary movement Di Yunge. A principal contributor to the movement's periodicals and anthologies, he was editor of Literatur un Leben in 1915 and co-editor of Der Inzl with Mani Leib from 1915 to 1926. His works included the 1922 Fun Mayn Zumer (From My Summer), which was a transitional work from his earlier impressionistic poems to a tonally more mystical, the poem Tarnow, which captured the Jewish community of the town of Tarnow, and the 1954 Fun Unzer Frillig (From Our Spring), which included his reminiscences of Di Yunge.

Iceland came to know poetess Anna Margolin when he was thirty-five. They became involved, and she inspired him to write Fun Mayn Zumer, which depicted their emotional struggle before finding fulfillment in each other. His memoir Fun Unzer Frillig included a lengthy biographical sketch of her.

In 1918, Iceland became a regular contributor for Der Tog, followed by Der Tog Morgn Zshurnal. He translated Heinrich Heine's series of poems from Die Nordsee (North Sea) and four volumes of pose by Heine into Yiddish. He also translated Herman Bang's novels De uden Fædreland (Without a Fatherland) and Fratelli Bedini. He translated poems from, among others, Richard Dehmel, Max Dauthendey, Friedrich Nietzsche, and Robert Louis Stevenson. He also translated works from Chinese poets, including Su Dongpo, Du Fu, and Zhuangzi. He wrote a drama called R’ Asher Kahane (Rabbi Asher Kahane).

Ill for the last few years of his life, Iceland retired from his journalistic activities and settled in Miami Beach, Florida, where he published his last book. He died there on June 18, 1955. He was buried in New York.

References 

1884 births
1955 deaths
People from Mielec County
Jews from Galicia (Eastern Europe)
People from the Kingdom of Galicia and Lodomeria
American people of Polish-Jewish descent
Austro-Hungarian Jews
Austro-Hungarian emigrants to the United States
Yiddish-language playwrights
Translators to Yiddish
Yiddish-language poets
Jewish American poets
Jewish American journalists
20th-century American poets
Poets from New York (state)
American male poets
20th-century American translators
20th-century American newspaper editors
Journalists from New York City
Editors of New York City newspapers
People from Miami Beach, Florida
Burials in New York (state)